MPK may refer to:

Politics and government
 Minjoo Party of Korea
 Majlis Perbandaran Klang, the municipal council of Klang, Malaysia
  (MPK), National Defence Training Association of Finland, a Finnish government-organised voluntary military training organisation

Science, technology and engineering
 Martian Piloted Complex or MPK, Soviet-era concept for a human mission to Mars
 Memory protection key, a mechanism to divide computer memory
 .mpk, a filename extension used by Nintendo 64 emulators
 Methyl propyl ketone, a colorless liquid ketone
 MPK, the short version of the Walther MP submachine gun

Transportation
 Mokpo Airport (IATA airport code), Mokpo, South Korea
 Moorpark (Amtrak station), an Amtrak and Metrolink rail station in California, US
 Mosspark railway station, a First ScotRail station on Paisley Canal Line, Scotland
 Merinda Park railway station, a station in Melbourne, Australia

Other uses 
 Magpakailanman, a Philippine drama anthology program broadcast by GMA Network
 Maine Pyar Kiya, a 1989 Bollywood film
 Marginal product of capital, in economics
 Menlo Park, California, United States

See also
 MP5K, a Heckler & Koch submachine Gun